The Guinean pike conger (Cynoponticus ferox) is an eel in the family Muraenesocidae (pike congers). It was described by Oronzio Gabriele Costa in 1846. It is a marine, subtropical eel which is known from the eastern Atlantic Ocean, including Gibraltar, the western Mediterranean, and Angola. It inhabits sand and mud substrates on the continental shelf.

The Guinean pike conger's diet consists of finfish, mollusks, and shrimp such as Penaeus notialis. It is of commercial use to fisheries.

References

Muraenesocidae
Fish described in 1846
Taxa named by Oronzio Gabriele Costa